Old Smoke may refer to:

John Morrissey, American politician, bare-knuckle boxing champion and mob boss
Sayenqueraghta, war chief of the Eastern Seneca tribe
Old Smokey, a nickname used for the electric chair in New Jersey